HC1, HC-1 or HC.1 may refer to:

Helicopter
 HC-1 (Helicopter Combat Support Squadron 1), a former helicopter squadron of the US Navy
 Boeing-Vertol HC-1, a large American tandem rotor helicopter
 Boeing Chinook HC.1, operated by the Royal Air Force
 Aérospatiale-Westland Puma HC.1, a four-bladed medium transport/utility helicopter

Technology
 Sony HDR-HC1, a camcorder
 HC1, a wearable headset computer in the Golden-i platform

See also
 HC-One, a British healthcare management company